Mummer's Day, or "Darkie Day" as it is sometimes known (a corruption of the original Darking Day), is a traditional Cornish midwinter celebration that occurs every year on Boxing Day and New Year's Day in Padstow, Cornwall. It was originally part of the pagan heritage of midwinter celebrations that were regularly celebrated throughout Cornwall where people would take part in the traditional custom of guise dancing, which involves disguising themselves by painting their faces black or wearing masks.

The dark face paint, masks and dark clothing are symbols of the celebration of the winter solstice, and is in contrast to the "white" summer solstice festivals of Cornish towns such as the 'Obby 'Oss festival in Padstow and the Golowan Festival which started in Penzance in 1991. The Montol Festival in Penzance which started in 2007 is a modern recreation of a winter solstice celebration, during which people guise dance with darkly painted skin or masks to disguise themselves.

There has been controversy in the British media regarding Mummer's Day, due to the blackened faces and the term Darkie Day, with commentators interpreting the festival as racist. The name Darkie Day is actually a corruption of the original Darking Day, which refers to the "darking" (darkening) of the faces.

Darkie/Darking Parties
Throughout the 19th century, especially in the east of Cornwall, Darkie Parties (originally Darking Parties) were common Christmas celebrations held in Cornish homes and public houses.  People would have performed traditional Cornish and other seasonal music and seasonal folk drama such as Mummers plays.
"Blacking up" was also a way of preventing the labourer's Lords and Masters from recognizing who they were. Having a good time and enjoyment was frowned upon and not seen to be "God-fearing".

Controversy over Mummer's Day
Once an unknown local charity event, the day has recently seen controversy due to increased media coverage. While the original celebration had no connection with black people, in modern times, it is usually considered racist for white people to "black up" for any reason. Although some commentators have linked the day with racism, Padstonians insist that this is not the case and deny both the description and the allegations.

1970s review
Long before the controversy, Charlie Bate, a noted Padstow folk advocate, recounted that in the 1970s the content and conduct of the day were carefully reviewed to avoid potential offence. The Devon and Cornwall Constabulary have taken video evidence twice and concluded there were no grounds for prosecution. Nonetheless protests resurface annually. The day has now been renamed "Mummer's Day" in an attempt to avoid offence and identify it more clearly with established British tradition. The debate has now been subject to academic scrutiny. It is hoped that some of the more untraditional Minstrel songs that were incorporated in favour of traditional Cornish songs will soon be discontinued.

Minstrel songs
Although Mummer's Day is a centuries-old tradition, the act of performing minstrel songs owes its origins to the late 19th and early 20th century. Either as a result of confusion as to the real origins of disguise in the festival, or as a way of introducing more popular tunes in place of the well-preserved and still-performed Padstow carols, songs connected with jazz and the blacked-up minstrel craze of the era (which ultimately created huge stars such as Al Jolson) became associated with the guise dancing practices of the festival. The works of American songwriter Stephen Foster particularly featured.

Other researchers claim that the spirituals sung by followers of Blue 'Oss in advance of May Day originate in the groundswell of support for American black people that was extremely strong in areas of the UK where Methodism was predominant. Among other events, this led to the Manchester textile workers voting to refuse to make uniforms for the Confederate Army during the American Civil War. Minstrel songs and spirituals were performed to gain support for American black people, and the researchers claim the "blacking up" of traditional guise dancing was adapted to show this support.

Regardless of its origins, the minstrel songs contributed to the recent controversy over the festival due to the association with black people, despite the face painting having no connection. In order to revert to the original meaning of the festival, and recognising the offence that can be caused in the 21st century, the minstrel songs are being phased out of the festival, and the alternative name of Mummer's Day is now preferred.

See also 
Golowan festival
Mummers Parade
Tom Bawcock's Eve

References

External links

Tewkesbury's Millennia of Mummers' Heritage kept alive - United Kingdom

December observances
Cornish culture
Festivals in Cornwall
Cornish nationalism
Cornish festivals
Winter events in England